The following is a list of awards and nominations received by American actor and producer Mark Ruffalo throughout his career.

Major associations

Academy Awards

British Academy Film Awards

The British Academy Britannia Awards

Golden Globe Awards

Grammy Awards

Primetime Emmy Awards

Screen Actors Guild Awards

Tony Awards

Other awards and nominations

AACTA Awards

Awards Circuit Community Awards

AARP Movies for Grownups Awards

CinEuphoria Awards

Critics' Choice Awards

Gold Derby Awards

Golden Schmoes Awards

Gotham Awards

Hollywood Film Awards

Independent Spirit Awards

International Online Cinema Awards

Italian Online Movie Awards

MTV Movie + TV Awards

Satellite Awards

Scream Awards

Teen Choice Awards

Critics associations

See also
 Mark Ruffalo on screen and stage

References

Ruffalo, Mark